Soviet Kitsch is the major label debut and third album by American singer/songwriter Regina Spektor. It was originally released on Shoplifter Records in May 2003 but was reissued in August 2004 when Spektor signed with Sire Records. The title is drawn from Milan Kundera's expression for the vacuous aesthetics of Stalinist-style communism, a theme in his book The Unbearable Lightness of Being. One version of the album was released with a bonus DVD, which included a short promotional film titled The Survival Guide to Soviet Kitsch and the music video for the song "Us".

Reception

"I became obsessed with Soviet Kitsch," said British singer Kate Nash. "The songs are so powerful and raw. There's a track called 'Chemo Limo' where she sings about having kids. I was utterly convinced she had children of her own, but it's all made-up. That's one of the great things about her: she has a way of making you believe in what she's singing about."

In 2009, the album was included in NME's list of 100 greatest albums of the decade.

Commercial performance
As of 2007 the album has sold 54,000 copies in the United States.

Track listing
All songs written by Regina Spektor.
"Ode to Divorce" – 3:42
"Poor Little Rich Boy" – 2:27
"Carbon Monoxide" – 4:59
"The Flowers" – 3:54
"Us" – 4:52
"Sailor Song" – 3:15
"* * *" – 0:44
"Your Honor" – 2:10
"Ghost of Corporate Future" – 3:21
"Chemo Limo" – 6:04
"Somedays" – 3:21

Deluxe version bonus track
 "Scarecrow and Fungus" – 2:29

Standard vinyl release
 "Scarecrow and Fungus" – 2:29
"December" – 2:10

Track 7 is titled "Whisper" on digital versions of the album. It is a brief spoken word piece in which Spektor and her brother, Barry "Bear" Spektor, discuss the following song ("Your Honor").

Personnel
 Regina Spektor - piano, voice, rhodes, drumstick, percussion, producer, songwriter
 Alan Bezozi - producer, drums, percussion, heartbeat
 Oren Bloedow - guitar
 Graham Maby - bass
 Gordon Raphael - percussion
 Bear Spektor - whispers ("***")
 The 4x4 String Quartet - strings ("Us" and "Somedays")
 Kill Kenada - backing punk band ("Your Honor")
 Eric Biondo - songwriter (one lyric and melody sampled in "Somedays")

Releases

References

2004 albums
Regina Spektor albums
Sire Records albums
Anti-folk albums
Albums produced by Gordon Raphael